Primula allionii is a species of flowering plant in the family Primulaceae, native to southern France and northern Italy where it is found on cliffs at an altitude of .

The specific epithet allionii honours the Italian botanist Carlo Allioni.

It requires well-drained alkaline soil and dry conditions, and is usually cultivated in an alpine house.

References

allionii
Alpine flora
Flora of France
Flora of Italy